Chris Covington (born January 3, 1996) is an American football linebacker who is a free agent. He was drafted by the Dallas Cowboys in the sixth round of the 2018 NFL Draft. He played college football at Indiana.

Early years
Covington attended Al Raby High School, where he played as a quarterback and defensive back. As a senior, he posted 1,993 passing yards, 26 passing touchdowns, 657 rushing yards, 13 rushing touchdowns, 6 tackles for loss, 3 interceptions, one forced fumble, while receiving All-city and All-conference honors.

He was considered a two-star recruit as an athlete.

College career
Covington accepted a football scholarship from Indiana University to be a defensive player. As a freshman, he was tried at linebacker and defensive back. After Tre Roberson and Cam Coffman announced they would be transferring to other schools, Covington was moved to be the backup quarterback behind Nate Sudfeld. He appeared in four of the first five games and was used mostly in the Wildcat formation. In the sixth game against the University of Iowa, he saw extensive action after Sudfeld was injured with a separated left shoulder in the second quarter, registering 3 out of 12 completions for 31 yards, 11 carries for 41 yards, but suffered a season-ending torn ACL during the contest.

As a sophomore, he was moved to linebacker during spring practice. He appeared in the last 8 contests of the season and tallied 4 tackles (all against Penn State University).

As junior, he played in all 13 games (one start) backing up Marcus Oliver. He posted 29 tackles (19 solo), 2 sacks, one quarterback pressure, 3 tackles for loss, and one forced fumble. He earned his first career start in the eleventh game against the University of Michigan, making 6 tackles, one sack, and one forced fumble.

As a senior, he started all 12 games at middle linebacker, replacing the recently graduated Oliver. He registered 85 tackles (third on the team), 50 solo tackles (third on the team), 12 tackles for loss (second on the team), 3 sacks, 5 quarterback hurries (second on the team), 5 passes defensed (third on the team), and one fumble recovery. He was named the team's Defensive Player of the Year. He finished his college career with 118 tackles, 70 solo tackles, 5 sacks, and 15 tackles for loss.

Professional career

Dallas Cowboys
Covington was selected by the Dallas Cowboys in the sixth round (193rd overall) of the 2018 NFL Draft. As a rookie, he was a backup linebacker and was declared inactive in 11 games. He appeared in five games, playing mostly on special teams and had one tackle.

On August 31, 2019, Covington was waived by the Cowboys and re-signed to the practice squad. He was promoted to the active roster on September 10, only to be waived four days later and re-signed back to the practice squad. He was promoted to the active roster on December 14. He appeared in 3 games as a reserve player, making 3 defensive tackles.

Covington was released by the Cowboys on April 30, 2020.

Indianapolis Colts
On December 15, 2020, Covington was signed to the Indianapolis Colts' practice squad. On December 29, Covington was released from the practice squad.

NFL career statistics

References

External links
Indiana Hoosiers bio

1996 births
Living people
Players of American football from Chicago
American football quarterbacks
American football linebackers
Indiana Hoosiers football players
Dallas Cowboys players
Indianapolis Colts players